Gabungan Sepakabola Indonesia Sambas or Gabsis is an Indonesian football team based in Sambas Regency, West Kalimantan. They currently competes in Liga 3.

Honours
 Liga 3 West Kalimantan
 Winner: 2021

References

Football clubs in Indonesia
Football clubs in West Kalimantan